Copelatus apicalis is a species of diving beetle. It is part of the genus Copelatus in the subfamily Copelatinae of the family Dytiscidae. It was described by Fairmaire in 1898. Copelatus apicalis is distributed along the coastline of much of Africa.

References

apicalis
Beetles described in 1898
Beetles of Africa